Tour du Parc is a skyscraper in the Bagatelle district of Toulouse, France. It began construction and opened in 1968. With 21 stories completed so far, Tour du Parc stands 67m tall, making it the tallest building in the city after the Cité Roguet of the Patte d'Oie district (63m tall).

References

Buildings and structures in Toulouse